The Taxpayer Bill of Rights (abbreviated TABOR) is a concept advocated by conservative and free market libertarian groups, primarily in the United States, as a way of limiting the growth of government. It is not a charter of rights but a provision requiring that increases in overall tax revenue be tied to inflation and population increases unless larger increases are approved by referendum.

1992 Colorado amendment
In 1992, the voters of the state approved a measure which amended Article X of the Colorado Constitution that restricts revenues for all levels of government (state, local, and schools). Under TABOR, state and local governments cannot raise tax rates without voter approval and cannot spend revenues collected under existing tax rates without voter approval if revenues grow faster than the rate of inflation and population growth. Revenue in excess of the TABOR limit, commonly referred to as the "TABOR surplus", must be refunded to taxpayers, unless voters approve a revenue change as an offset in a referendum. Under TABOR, the state has returned more than $2 billion to taxpayers.

The allowance for spending to grow at the rate of inflation plus population growth means that inflation-adjusted per capita spending generally did not decrease.  However, spending growth could be interrupted due to an economic recession, in which case inflation-adjusted per capita spending did decrease—and TABOR did not permit inflation-adjusted per capita spending to return to its pre-recession level. This was known as the "ratchet-down effect," and it occurred in FY2001–02 and FY2002–03.  The ratchet-down effect was desirable to those who believed government was consuming too large a fraction of Colorado's gross state product (GSP), and undesirable to those who believed government was consuming too small a fraction of Colorado's GSP.

In November 2005, Coloradans approved Referendum C, a ballot measure that loosened many of TABOR's restrictions. This measure allows the state to retain and spend money from existing revenue sources above the TABOR limit each year beginning in FY 2005–06. The state may spend all revenue subject to TABOR for five years through FY 2009–10. Beginning in FY 2010–11, the state may spend revenue above the TABOR limit up to a capped amount known as the "Referendum C cap. The Referendum C cap grows from the prior year's cap instead of the prior year's spending by inflation plus population growth. In effect, Referendum C eliminated the ratchet-down effect.

Any retained Referendum C revenue (revenue above the allowable TABOR limit but below the Referendum C cap) is statutorily required to be spent on health care, education, firefighter and police retirement plans and strategic transportation projects. Colorado Legislative Council Staff reported in 2009 that the state would have faced a significant budget shortfall had Referendum C not passed. Therefore, in many instances the Referendum C money that has been spent is not new money to programs, rather it maintained the programs and prevented them from undergoing cuts. It is money the programs may not have received without Referendum C, but it is not additional money when compared with prior years. However, the report also admits that it is impossible to enumerate this impact because it would require knowledge of what budgetary actions the state would have taken had Referendum C failed. Referendum C and other attempts to mitigate the effects of TABOR are referred to as "de-Brucing" after Douglas Bruce, the author of the amendment. In November 2005, Colorado residents voted to suspend for five years the state's self-imposed revenue caps as outlined in the state's Taxpayer Bill of Rights.The effects of TABOR on government spending and economic growth have been a popular discussion topic in recent years. Proponents accredit much of Colorado's economic prosperity in the period immediately following adoption of the law to the limit and its effect on government spending and taxes 

When Colorado voters passed the law that decriminalized marijuana, the voters approved using tax money generated from marijuana sales for schools, police, and drug education. However, the tax money might end up not being used for any of those programs. The Taxpayer's Bill of Rights restrains the state's ability to tax and spend. As of April 2015, projections for marijuana tax revenue for Colorado are at $58 million. But that money might have to be returned to taxpayers, due to the provisions in the state's Taxpayer Bill of Rights.

Advocates
Douglas Bruce is a conservative activist and former legislator in the U.S. state of Colorado, most widely known for being the author of Colorado's Taxpayer Bill of Rights (TABOR).

A strict advocate for limited government, Bruce wrote and promoted TABOR, a spending limitation measure approved by Colorado voters in 1992; his name is so associated with the measure that attempts to bypass its restrictions are known as "de-Brucing."

Advocates like Douglas Bruce see the experience of Colorado as an example of the positive effects of tax decreases. They cite the fact that Colorado's economic growth in the dozen or so years since this system was implemented has been well in excess of that of the U.S. as a whole. They also say that deciding tax increases in referendums is more democratic, as legislators may be beholden to Lobby groups, special interests and lobbyists.

One prominent advocacy group in favor of TABOR is Americans for Prosperity. Many of their twenty state chapters are currently working on plans to implement TABOR in their respective states. In Florida, AFP lobbied the Taxation and Budget Reform Committee to place a TABOR on the November 2008 ballot. And in Texas, AFP spearheaded the Taxpayer Protection Act concept  of giving taxpayers greater control over how much government taxpayers want and are willing to pay for. It was also on the 2008 Republican Primary Ballot as a nonbinding initiative.

Many advocates of a more libertarian view, such as Americans for Limited Government, say that reduced taxation is a noble goal for its own sake, leading to increases in financial freedom and economic prosperity. Others note that Colorado has continued growth as well as larger tax revenues concurrent with the TABOR act.

The TABOR Foundation has partnered with Mountain States Legal Foundation to sue to enforce TABOR in Colorado, challenging car taxes and sales taxes enacted without a vote of the people. MSLF has also sued on behalf of the Colorado Union of Taxpayers Foundation's members, challenging the City of Aspen's grocery bag tax.

Opponents

Opponents argue that the lack of tax revenue has hurt Colorado in many ways. For instance, Colorado ranks 48th in the nation for higher education funding (per personal income level), which is the lowest in 40 years, representing a drop from 34th in 1992. In another example, Colorado now ranks 44th in what it spends to repair its roads.

Opponents also argue that Colorado's economic growth has largely been despite – not because of – this system, and is a result of changing societal desires for open spaces, outdoor sports opportunities, and other "quality of life" issues that are now imperiled by Colorado's inability to provide expanding governmental services. They point out that almost 90% of state tax revenues are now already earmarked for various purposes, handicapping the state legislature and giving it very little flexibility.

They also add that the process has not been as "democratic" as its advocates purport, citing the off-year voting and complex wording that may skew results. Some opponents claim that complicated tax decisions are best decided by deliberation based on well-informed argument and informed consent, such as presumably occurs in legislatures, rather than the simplistic and emotionally charged appeals that tend to dominate referendums.

Many others argue against the "Population Plus Inflation" formula, because
 Population: public service are focused on populations (e.g. senior citizens, children, ... ) whose number do not run parallel with the population of the state as a whole. For example, the population in Florida is expected to increase by 27% over the next twenty years, but the senior citizen population is expected to increase by 87%.
 Inflation: public services are services, and services as a whole have a higher rate of increase than inflation because services are less likely to experience benefits that consumer products do.

Repeal efforts 
Over the years, TABOR opponents have tried to challenge it in various ways. A federal lawsuit was filed in May 2011, which has dragged through the courts for years. In May 2017, the U.S. District Court ruled the plaintiffs didn't have standing to sue, but in July 2019, the United States Court of Appeals for the Tenth Circuit reversed that decision, allowing the lawsuit to proceed.  In early 2015, former Governor Roy Romer, offering Governor John Hickenlooper advice for his new term, said he should lead the charge to repeal TABOR. Gov. Hickenlooper smiled and applauded but did not respond at the event; however, a few weeks later, he said such a move would be doomed. The Denver Post editorial board, which opposed TABOR in 1992, ran an editorial in Feb. 2017 titled "Make Colorado greater: Fix TABOR", in which they offered three reasons why an outright repeal wasn't realistic, but suggested three possible workarounds.

TABOR in other states

Reforms similar to Colorado's have been put forward in several states. In 2006, two Libertarian groups financially backed by New York real estate developer Howie Rich campaigned for laws similar to TABOR in eight states.

Informed observers feel that such advocates have the greatest likelihood of success in jurisdictions which have initiative and referendum and can be put on the ballot directly by voters, at least in the short term, as legislators are very unlikely to be willing to give up such control over the power of the purse unless voters overwhelmingly demand it. TABOR advocates were handed a setback when a similar proposition, on the ballot on the same day as the California gubernatorial recall of 2003, was overwhelmingly defeated on the same day that a Democratic governor was being recalled by a large margin.

It appears far more likely, at least in the short term, that measures similar to the "Taxpayer Bill of Rights" will be adopted on the county and municipal level than on a statewide basis beyond Colorado; one municipality adopting the plan in recent years has been Spring Hill, Tennessee.  After the November 2005 setback for proponents in Colorado, advocates in many regions are now downplaying the name "Taxpayer Bill of Rights" in favor of other terms such as "Spending Limitation Movement".  Organizations dedicated to shrinking government are pushing for the adoption of TABORs in other states.  Currently, Colorado is the only state with TABOR.  In 2005, TABOR proposals were introduced in about half of the states. A TABOR referendum on the ballot in Maine as an initiative effort led by Mary Adams was defeated in November 2006.  Similar referendums were also defeated in Nebraska and Oregon that year.  Similar initiatives in Maine and Washington were defeated in 2009.

In North Carolina, some Republicans want a constitutional amendment to limit growth in spending to population growth and the rate of inflation.

National legislation
The concept is connected to several laws that have been passed. Examples include the Omnibus Taxpayer Bill of Rights (Subtitle J of the Technical and Miscellaneous Revenue Act of 1988), the Taxpayer Bill of Rights 2 passed in 1996, and the Taxpayer Bill of Rights III passed in 1998.

Nationally, Members of Congress have made attempts to give taxpayers more rights in terms of tax debts and interactions with the IRS. Congressman Pete Roskam (R-IL) introduced a bill in the House of Representatives called the Taxpayer Bill of Rights (H.R. 1058). 11 Republicans cosponsored the bill.  The bill would require that the IRS provide people with quality service; people would only have to pay the correct amount of their taxes owed; the IRS would be required to implement better customer service; and people would have a "voice" in the process when challenging an IRS ruling.

IRS Taxpayer Bill of Rights
The IRS has offered its own version of a taxpayer bill of rights since the year 2014. Describing the rights, the IRS has written, "Each and every taxpayer has a set of fundamental rights they should be aware of when dealing with the IRS. Explore your rights and our obligations to protect them." The rights are available to the public online in a document called Publication 1: Your Rights as a Taxpayer. To help people understand their rights when dealing with the IRS, the IRS has an independent agency within the IRS called the Taxpayer Advocate Service.

1989 Illinois law

The Taxpayers' Bill of Rights Act (20 ILCS 2520), is a provision of Illinois state law. It is broken up into seven sections throughout the act. Section 1 is stating the name of the act. Section 2 is Legislative Declaration and states "The General Assembly further finds that the Illinois tax system is based largely on self-assessment." Section 2 also states "The General Assembly finds and declares that taxes are the most sensitive point of contact between citizens and their government." Section 4 explains "the Department of Revenue shall have the following powers and duties to protect the rights of taxpayers," and list 10 different responsibilities the government has. Section 5 is the taxpayer's suits. It says "Taxpayers have the right to sue the Department of Revenue if such Department intentionally or recklessly disregards tax laws or regulations in collecting taxes" Section 6 is the review of liens, and section 7 is dedicated to the cost.

See also
 Taxpayer Bill of Rights III, an Act of Congress
 Proposition 13, which capped property taxes in California
 Proposition 2½, which capped property and excise taxes in Massachusetts

References

External links
 "Taxpayer Bill of Rights Legal Definition of Taxpayer Bill of Rights." The Free Dictionary. Farlex, n.d. Web. November 2, 2016.

Taxation in the United States
Conservatism in the United States
Libertarian theory
Libertarian terms
Constitution of Colorado